Meranoplus radamae is a Malagasy species of ant in the genus Meranoplus. The species diurnal.

Distribution
Meranoplus radamae is restricted to the grasslands and woodlands of the High Plateau, and the spiny forests of southern Madagascar. Specimens are known from 370 to 1550 m above sea level, and nests have been collected under stones in grassland and from ground nests. A few collections have been made in southern rainforest sites, but these may represent local adaptation to disturbed habitats.

References

External links

Myrmicinae
Hymenoptera of Africa
Insects described in 1891